Ranunculus amphitrichus, commonly known as the small river buttercup,  is a species of buttercup found in southeastern Australia and New Zealand.

References

amphitrichus
Flora of New South Wales
Plants described in 1885
Flora of New Zealand
Taxa named by William Colenso